Littlefillan is a suburb of Johannesburg, South Africa. The tiny suburb in Sandton is separated between Morningside and Parkmore. It is located in Region E of the City of Johannesburg Metropolitan Municipality.

History
Originally the land was a farm called Gilfillan's little farm name after its owner N.H. Gilfillan.

References

Johannesburg Region E